State Route 89 (SR 89) is a  state highway in the south-central part of the U.S. state of Alabama.

Route description

SR 89 travels through the heart of Alabama's Black Belt, recognized as one of the poorer areas of the state. The highway serves as an extension of the northbound leg of SR 21, which turns eastwardly in eastern Wilcox County. The path of SR 89 travels through rural areas and does not traverse any incorporated communities. The northern terminus of the highway is in Dallas County at Elm Bluff.

History
SR 89 was created in 1957 as a renumbering of the last portion of the former SR 100 (the remainder was replaced by new SR 21). SR 89 was previously assigned to the road from Spanish Fort to the Georgia border; this became part of an extended SR 42 in 1957.

Major intersections

See also

References

089
Transportation in Wilcox County, Alabama
Transportation in Dallas County, Alabama